In Memory Of is an album by jazz saxophonist Stanley Turrentine, recorded for the Blue Note label in 1964 but not released until the 1980s, and performed by Turrentine with Blue Mitchell, Curtis Fuller, Herbie Hancock, Bob Cranshaw, and Otis Finch.

Reception

The Allmusic review by Michael Erlewine awarded the album 4½ stars.

Track listing
 "Fried Pies (Wes Montgomery) - 10:25
 "In Memory Of" (Randy Weston) - 6:58
 "Niger Mambo" (Bobby Benson) - 3:21
 "Make Someone Happy" (Jule Styne, Betty Comden, Adolph Green) - 6:20
 "Jodie's Cha Cha"  (Bill Lee) - 6:14
 "Sunday in New York" (Carroll Coates, Peter Nero) - 6:44
Recorded at the Van Gelder Studio, Englewood Cliffs, NJ on June 3, 1964.

Personnel
Stanley Turrentine - tenor saxophone
Blue Mitchell - trumpet
Curtis Fuller - trombone
Herbie Hancock - piano
Bob Cranshaw - bass
Otis Finch - drums
Mickey Roker - congas (1,2)

Production
 Alfred Lion - producer
 Rudy Van Gelder - engineer

References

1964 albums
Stanley Turrentine albums
Blue Note Records albums
Albums produced by Alfred Lion
Albums recorded at Van Gelder Studio